Deborrea robinsoni is a species of bagworm moth native to Madagascar.

Biology
The female has a  wingspan of 22.5–23.5 mm, it is known from rainforests in southern and north-eastern Madagascar (Fort-Dauphin and the Marojejy Massif).
Stated flight periods are December and March.

See also
 List of moths of Madagascar

References

Psychidae
Lepidoptera of Madagascar
Moths described in 1964
Moths of Madagascar
Moths of Africa